Cosmisoma plumicorne is a species of beetle in the family Cerambycidae. It was described by Dru Drury in 1782.

References

Cosmisoma
Beetles described in 1782